Chay Kasan (also Romanized as Chāy Kasan; also known as Chāy Kand) is a village in Harzandat-e Gharbi Rural District, in the Central District of Marand County, East Azerbaijan Province, Iran. At the 2006 census, its population was 122, in 30 families.

References 

Populated places in Marand County